Group D of UEFA Euro 2000 began on 11 June and ended on 21 June 2000. The joint-hosts of the tournament, the Netherlands, won the group ahead of 1998 world champions France. Czech Republic and Denmark were eliminated.

By the time of the final round of matches, both Czech Republic and Denmark had already been eliminated from the tournament, having each lost their opening two matches.

Teams

Notes

Standings

In the quarter-finals,
The winner of Group D, Netherlands, advanced to play the runner-up of Group C, FR Yugoslavia.
The runner-up of Group D, France, advanced to play the winner of Group C, Spain.

Matches

France vs Denmark

Netherlands vs Czech Republic

Czech Republic vs France

Denmark vs Netherlands

Denmark vs Czech Republic

France vs Netherlands

References

External links
UEFA Euro 2000 Group D

Group D
Group
Group
Group
Czech Republic at UEFA Euro 2000